Pseudomonas costantinii is a Gram-negative bacterium that causes brown blotch disease in cultivated mushrooms. It demonstrates hemolytic activity. The type strain is CFBP 5705.

References

External links
Type strain of Pseudomonas costantinii at BacDive -  the Bacterial Diversity Metadatabase

Pseudomonadales
Bacteria described in 2002